ATN Sony Aath is a Canadian exempt Category B Bengali language specialty channel owned by Asian Television Network (ATN).  It broadcasts programming from Sony Aath and Canadian content.

Sony Aath is a premium Bengali language movie channel from India.  It has the largest Bengali film library in India, with over 1000 titles in its lineup.  It airs both contemporary films as well as beloved classics and features a new movie premiere every week.

External links
 
 Sony Aath

Bengali-Canadian culture
Digital cable television networks in Canada
Television channels and stations established in 2010
South Asian television in Canada